Bradford James Shwedo is a retired United States Air Force lieutenant general who served as the Director for Command, Control, Communications, and Computers/Cyber and Chief Information Officer of the Joint Staff. Prior to that, he was the Chief of Information Dominance and Chief Information Officer of the Office of the Secretary of the Air Force. He now serves as the first director of the United States Air Force Academy's Institute of Future Conflict.

References

Living people
Year of birth missing (living people)
Place of birth missing (living people)
United States Air Force generals
Lieutenant generals